Camas County Highpoint, at  above sea level is the second highest peak in the Smoky Mountains of Idaho and the highest point in Camas County. The peak is also on the border of Sawtooth National Recreation Area and the Fairfield Ranger District of Sawtooth National Forest.

References 

Mountains of Idaho
Mountains of Blaine County, Idaho
Mountains of Camas County, Idaho
Sawtooth National Forest